SS Orbita was an ocean liner built in 1913-14 by Harland & Wolff in Belfast for the Pacific Steam Navigation Company. She was launched on Tuesday, 7 July 1914.

She provided transatlantic passenger transport, measured about 15,500 gross register tons, and was 550.3 ft x 67.3 ft.

History
From 1921 to 1923 the Orbita was chartered to operate the Royal Mail's United Kingdom – New York City service. In 1923 she was transferred to Royal Mail ownership, remaining with them for three years before reverting to the Pacific Steam Navigation Company.

Between 1946 and 1950 the Orbita was used as a troopship and to transport emigrants to Australia and New Zealand. The Orbita was an important part of the history of multiracialism in the United Kingdom, arriving with the second group of immigrants from the West Indies (after the Empire Windrush). The passengers were part of the first large group of West Indian immigrants to the UK after the Second World War.

War service
The Orbita entered service as an armed merchant cruiser and later as a troop ship during the First World War, delaying her maiden voyage as a passenger liner, from Liverpool to Rio de Janeiro, until 1919. In 1941, in the Second World War, she was requisitioned as a troop ship, leaving Durban SA she transported 268 men of the first unit of British Honduran Foresters via Trinidad and Halifax Nova Scotia to the Port of Liverpool on 12 September 1941 (Board of Trade: Commercial and Statistical Department and successors: Inwards Passenger Lists. Kew, Surrey, England). She continued as a troop ship until at least 1949.

Demise
The SS Orbita was dismantled in October 1950 in Newport, South Wales.

References

1915 ships
Ocean liners
Passenger ships of the United Kingdom
Ships of the Pacific Steam Navigation Company
Steamships of the United Kingdom
Ships built in Belfast
Ships built by Harland and Wolff
World War I Auxiliary cruisers of the Royal Navy